Khaneqah-e Olya (also Romanized as Khāneqāh-e ‘Olyā and Khānqāh-e ‘Olyā) is a village in Javersiyan Rural District, Qareh Chay District, Khondab County, Markazi Province, Iran. At the 2006 census, its population was 950, in 264 families.

References 

Populated places in Khondab County